The 14th PMPC Star Awards for Television was held at the UP Theater, Quezon City on October 7, 2000 and was broadcast on RPN Channel 9 on Saturday Night Playhouse. The awards night was hosted by Pops Fernandez, Troy Montero, Dingdong Dantes, Ralion Alonzo and Kris Aquino and was directed by Al Quinn.

Awards

Nominees and winners

Special awards

Most major wins

Performers
Janno Gibbs
Ogie Alcasid
Michael V.
Keempee de Leon
Ai-Ai delas Alas

References

External links

PMPC Star Awards for Television